Ibrahim Abdi Mohamed (born 2000) is a Somali footballer who plays as a defender for Horseed.

Club career
Prior to joining Somali First Division club Horseed, Mohamed played for Gaadiidka.

International career
On 27 July 2019, Mohamed made his debut for Somalia in a 3–1 loss against Uganda during the 2020 African Nations Championship qualification stage.

References

2000 births
Living people
Association football defenders
Association football midfielders
Somalian footballers
Somalia international footballers